Union Pines High School is a four-year public high school located in Cameron, North Carolina. Opened in 1964, the school currently enrolls 1,359 students and is one of the three public high schools in the Moore County Public School Systems.

Union Pines' sports teams are part of the Tri-County Conference, which includes schools in Harnett, Lee, and Moore counties. The school has fielded several state championships in wrestling, tennis, golf, and basketball and individual state champions in wrestling, swimming, tennis, golf, and track and field.

References

Public high schools in North Carolina
Schools in Moore County, North Carolina